WAEC may refer to:

WAEC (AM), a radio station (860 AM) licensed to Atlanta, Georgia, United States
West African Examinations Council, an examination board in West African Anglophone countries